Diamond V–Eight (or DV8) is a city operation transport company in the Philippines and wholly owned by Villegas Group of Buses. It was formed in 2012.

Fleet
The fleet Diamond V–Eight is composed of 10 units. All of them are UD Trucks Condor PKB212 in Santarosa EXFOH body and Iveco Euromidi buses assembled by Santarosa motor works Philippines.

Destinations
Baclaran- SM Fairview via Quiapo, Lawton (Taft)

See also
 List of bus companies of the Philippines
 Transportation in the Philippines

References

External links
 

Bus companies of the Philippines